Stephen Mark Collins (born 21 March 1962) is an English former footballer who made 291 appearances in the Football League playing for Peterborough United (in two spells), Southend United and Lincoln City. He also played non-league football in the Football Conference for Kettering Town and Boston United, in the Southern League for Corby Town, and for Rothwell Town, Mirrlees Blackstone and Stamford. He played as a left back.

References

1962 births
Living people
People from Stamford, Lincolnshire
English footballers
Association football defenders
Peterborough United F.C. players
Southend United F.C. players
Lincoln City F.C. players
Kettering Town F.C. players
Boston United F.C. players
Corby Town F.C. players
Rothwell Town F.C. players
Blackstones F.C. players
Stamford A.F.C. players
English Football League players
National League (English football) players
Southern Football League players